Introduction is a Swedish rock band based in Stockholm. Often classified as psychedelic rock, Introduction is also influenced by classic rock, progressive rock and indie rock.

Introduction started out as a three piece band and has gone under the names The Splendid and Giantess during 2001 - 2006 but then changed the name to Introduction. Introduction's original members are Niklas Swanberg, lead singer and guitar, bassist Martin Hertsius and drummer Frank Houbaer Wagnerius. In 2005 Martin Hägglund, organist (former guitarist of Rowdy Ramblers) joined the band.

In 2005 Introduction started to record their debut album, which was supposed to be released on the label Sound Like an Orange!!, but due to internal problems within the label's organization the band signed to Santa Records, which finally released the album in 2009. The band also signed to the promotion agency Caprica Entertainment the same year.

Introduction's music has received great acclaim for its creativity and playfulness and was considered to be one of Sweden's most prominent psychedelic acts by Greek 'Metal Hammer'. They have performed live on festivals and venues since 2001, mostly in Sweden and Finland.

Introduction released their first studio album, Santa sets sail for Saturn on August 24, 2009, and plans a tour 2010 in support of it.

Discography

Albums
 Santa sets sail for Saturn (2009)

References
 [ Introduction: All Music]
 Tomsen, Lowcut Webzine (2009-10-19) (review in English). "Santa sets sail for Saturn review".
 Marcus Grahn, Värmlands Folkblad (2009-09-05) (review in Swedish). "Santa sets sail for Saturn review".
 Jonas Elgemark, Groove Magazine (2009-11-13) (review in Swedish). "Santa sets sail for Saturn review".
 Patrik Forshage, Nöjesguiden (2009-12-22) (review in Swedish). "Santa sets sail for Saturn review".
 Värmlands Folkblad rates Santa sets sail for Saturn as one of the best albums in 2009 (2009-12-19) (in Swedish).

External links
 Official website in English

Swedish indie rock groups
Musical groups established in 2001